Ab-e Mosla (also Romanized as Āb-e Moslà) is a village in Rudbar Rural District, Ruydar District, Khamir County, Hormozgan Province, Iran. At the 2006 census, its population was 39, in 10 families.

References 

Populated places in Khamir County